"Hold On" is a song by Canadian singer Justin Bieber. It was released through Def Jam Recordings on March 5, 2021, as the fourth single from his sixth studio album, Justice. Jon Bellion wrote the song with Bieber, Ali Tamposi, and producers Andrew Watt and Louis Bell. "Hold On" interpolates Gotye's 2011 single, "Somebody That I Used to Know", which was written by himself and Luiz Bonfá; therefore, Gotye and Bonfá are given songwriting credits on the song. A music video starring Bieber and Christine Ko was released alongside the song. The single has reached the top ten in twelve countries worldwide and has reached number four on the Billboard Global 200 chart.

Background and release
Justin Bieber released the singles "Holy" and "Lonely" in 2020, followed by "Anyone" in January 2021. He announced his sixth studio album, Justice, the following month. Its track "Hold On" was written by Bieber, Ali Tamposi, Jon Bellion, and producers Andrew Watt and Louis Bell. The song interpolates "Somebody That I Used to Know" (2011), written by Walter De Backer and Luiz Bonfá, who thus receive official songwriting credits.

Def Jam Recordings released "Hold On" as a single for digital download and streaming in various countries on March 5, 2021. The same day, Universal Music Group serviced the song to contemporary hit radio stations in Italy. British radio station BBC Radio 1 added it to rotation on March 12, followed by its sister station BBC Radio 2 the next day.

Composition and lyrics
"Hold On" is a mid-tempo synth-pop song that contains a driving pop rock beat and new wave elements. The song is set in the key of C minor. Chris DeVille from Stereogum wrote that the song "delve[s] into the synth-powered side of '80s rock". The song's two verses have light synths laid down before eventually transitioning to a punchy chorus where the music drops and the percussion takes over, all layering under Bieber's vocals. Roisin O'Connor of The Independent stated that the song's synths faintly recall Alphaville's "Forever Young", while its bassline is in the style of Fleetwood Mac. "Hold On" is about keeping faith during difficult and challenging times, with lyrics touching on Bieber's struggles with the spotlight over the years. In the chorus, Bieber promises that "Heaven is a place not too far away" and admits to "know[ing] how it feels to be someone who loses their way". Rachel Simon, writing for NBC Think, opined that on the track, Bieber "offers himself up as an example of how people can change for the better" and "act[s] as the support system his younger self wasn't lucky enough to have".

Commercial performance
"Hold On" debuted at number seven on the Canadian Hot 100 issued for March 20, 2021. The song peaked at number four in its third week on the chart. On the US Billboard Hot 100, it reached number 20. "Hold On" charted at number 10 on the UK Singles Chart. In Australia, the song peaked at number six and went Platinum. It reached number seven in New Zealand. "Hold On" peaked within the top 10 of national record charts, at number two in Denmark, number six in Malaysia, Singapore, number seven in Norway, number eight in Ireland, and number nine in Belgium, the Netherlands.

Critical reception
"Hold On" received critical acclaim by music critics. Crimson staff writer Angelina Shoemaker praised the track for "[refreshing] listeners with its straightforward message." This message, according to Shoemaker, "touches on an emotion close to many". Shoemaker also noted the musical rhythm and melody as a form of communication of feelings, with the feeling of loneliness conveyed by the track's "slow-wave rhythm" and the "expressive quality of his voice."

A review at The Musical Hype on March 8, 2021, three days after the track's release, rated the song 3.5 stars out of 5, and praised the lyrical content for offering "encouragement and support", as well as praising Bieber's messaging and writing and singing performance, stating that Bieber "sounds smooth and performs expressively". The reviewer's overall opinion of the song is largely positive, calling it a "winner for Justin Bieber."

Music blogger Thomas Bleach, who had previously reviewed other works of Bieber such as "Holy" and "Lonely", praised the message of hope and reassurance and enlightenment in the track's lyrics, noting its structural parallels to Gotye's 2011 top-hit "Somebody That I Used to Know", and further going on to praise Bieber's vocals. Overall, Thomas rates the song positively, and rates the song as a "strong and decisive moment", contrasting it to Changes, which Thomas rated negatively by calling it "monotonous."

Music video
Colin Tilley directed the music video for "Hold On", which stars Bieber and Taiwanese-American actress Christine Ko. Bieber shared a teaser of the clip on Instagram ahead of its release, followed by a livestream celebrating its release. It premiered at midnight on March 5, 2021. The video begins with policemen chasing Bieber and successfully shooting him, followed by a flashback. It is then revealed Bieber is trying to arrange money to pay Ko's medical bills, as her character is suffering from cancer. He spray paints a gun and resolves to steal money from a bank.

Live performances
Bieber performed "Hold On" during his Tiny Desk Concert, which premiered online on March 17, 2021. The next day, he performed the song on The Late Late Show with James Corden, with a backing band, surrounded by the image of a winding road projected on a green screen. Bieber performed it at Good Morning America on March 22; Justin Curto of Vulture stated that Bieber "rocked the distanced GMA stage, jumping around and playing off his band's energy". Three days later, he released the official Vevo Live performance for "Hold On", which was held in a deserted forest in Los Angeles amid red mood lighting and green and white lightning. Bieber "dance[d] and [ran]" during it, backed by two guitarists, a keyboardist, and a live drummer. In May 2, he performed the song on Big Brother Brasil 21.

Credits and personnel
Credits adapted from Tidal.

 Justin Bieber – lead vocals, backing vocals, songwriting
 Andrew Watt – songwriting, production, backing vocals, bass, guitar
 Louis Bell – songwriting, production, backing vocals, programming
 Ali Tamposi – songwriting, backing vocals
 Jon Bellion – songwriting, backing vocals
 Luiz Bonfa – songwriting
 Walter De Backer – songwriting
 Colin Leonard – mastering
 Josh Gudwin – mixing
 Heidi Wang – assistant mixing
 Devin Nakao – recording
 Paul LaMalfa – recording

Charts

Weekly charts

Year-end charts

Certifications

Release history

References

2021 singles
2021 songs
Def Jam Recordings singles
Justin Bieber songs
Music videos directed by Colin Tilley
Songs written by Andrew Watt (record producer)
Songs written by Jon Bellion
Songs written by Justin Bieber
Songs written by Gotye